USS South Carolina may refer to:

  was a schooner built in 1797 and later served the Revenue Cutter Service until 1803
  was a coastal patrol vessel built in 1799 and sold in 1802
  was a screw steamer built in 1860; served in the American Civil War and sold in 1866
  was a  launched in 1908 and sold for scrap in 1924
  was a  built in 1972 and decommissioned in 1999

See also
 L'Indien was a frigate built in 1778 during the American Revolutionary War; renamed South Carolina, she served with the South Carolina Navy before the British captured her in 1782
 

United States Navy ship names